A complex oxide is a chemical compound that contains oxygen and at least two other elements (or oxygen and just one other element that's in at least two oxidation states). Complex oxide materials are notable for their wide range of magnetic and electronic properties, such as ferromagnetism, ferroelectricity, and high-temperature superconductivity. These properties often come from their strongly correlated electrons in d or f orbitals.

Natural occurrence 

Many minerals found in the ground are complex oxides. Commonly studied mineral crystal families include spinels and perovskites.

Applications 

Complex oxide materials are used in a variety of commercial applications.

Magnets 

Magnets made of the complex oxide ferrite are commonly used in transformer cores and in inductors. Ferrites are ideal for these applications because they are magnetic, electrically insulating, and inexpensive.

Transducers and actuators 

Piezoelectric transducers and actuators are often made of the complex oxide PZT (lead zirconate titanate). These transducers are used in applications such ultrasound imaging and some microphones. PZT is also sometimes used for piezo ignition in lighters and gas grills.

Capacitors 

Complex oxide materials are the dominant dielectric material in ceramic capacitors. About one trillion ceramic capacitors are produced each year to be used in electronic equipment.

Fuel cells 

Solid oxide fuel cells often use complex oxide materials as their electrolytes, anodes, and cathodes.

Gemstone jewelry 

Many precious gemstones, such as emerald and topaz, are complex oxide crystals. Historically, some complex oxide materials (such as strontium titanate, yttrium aluminium garnet, and gadolinium gallium garnet) were also synthesized as inexpensive diamond simulants, though after 1976 they were mostly eclipsed by cubic zirconia.

New electronic devices 

As of 2015, there is research underway to commercialize complex oxides in new kinds of electronic devices, such as ReRAM, FeRAM, and memristors. Complex oxide materials are also being researched for their use in spintronics.

Another potential application of complex oxide materials is superconducting power lines. A few companies have invested in pilot projects, but the technology is not widespread.

Commonly studied complex oxides 
 Lead zirconate titanate (a piezoelectric material)
 Lanthanum aluminate (a high-dielectric insulator)
 Strontium titanate (a high-dielectric semiconductor)
 Lanthanum strontium manganite (a material exhibiting colossal magnetoresistance)
 Barium titanate (a multiferroic material)
 Bismuth ferrite (a multiferroic material)
 Yttrium barium copper oxide (a high-temperature superconductor)
 Bismuth strontium calcium copper oxide (a high-temperature superconductor)

See also 
 Mixed oxide
 Multiferroics
 Mott insulator
 Colossal magnetoresistance
 Half metal
 Lanthanum aluminate-strontium titanate interface

References

External links 
 Materials science: Enter the oxides
 Condensed-matter physics: Complex oxides on fire
 Complex oxides: A tale of two enemies
 Oxide interfaces

Oxides
Ferromagnetic materials
Superconductivity